Martin Vantruba (born 7 February 1998) is a Slovak footballer who plays for Spartak Trnava of the Fortuna Liga as a goalkeeper.

Club career
Vantruba was promoted to Spartak Trnava first team in summer 2016. He made his league debut for Trnava on 28 July 2017 against Podbrezová.

Slavia
In January 2018, he signed a four-and-a-half-year contract with Slavia Prague, but was loaned back to Spartak Trnava for the rest of the season.

In January 2019, he joined Železiarne Podbrezová on loan until the end of the season.

Return to Spartak Trnava
In June 2022, Vantruba re-signed with Spartak Trnava after four seasons. Post arrival, he expressed disappointment about the fact that he spent most of his tenure with Slavia Prague on loans, but he highly valued the experienced and looked forward to cooperating with Dominik Takáč and progressing with Spartak through Conference League qualifiers.

Personal life
He has a twin brother named Tomáš who is also a footballer.

Honours 
Spartak Trnava
 Fortuna Liga: 2017–18

References

1998 births
Living people
Sportspeople from Trnava
Slovak footballers
Slovak expatriate footballers
Slovakia youth international footballers 
Slovakia under-21 international footballers 
Association football goalkeepers
FC Spartak Trnava players
SK Slavia Prague players
FK Železiarne Podbrezová players
FK Pohronie players
1. FK Příbram players
FC Nordsjælland players
FC DAC 1904 Dunajská Streda players
Slovak Super Liga players
Czech First League players 
Danish Superliga players
2. Liga (Slovakia) players
Slovak expatriate sportspeople in the Czech Republic 
Slovak expatriate sportspeople in Denmark 
Expatriate footballers in the Czech Republic
Expatriate men's footballers in Denmark